Lords of Middle-earth, Volume II is a 1987 role-playing game supplement published by Iron Crown Enterprises for Middle-earth Role Playing.

Publication history
Lords of Middle-earth, Volume II - The Mannish Races was written by Pete Fenlon, with Mark Colburn, Terry Amthor, and Coleman Charlton, with a cover by Angus McBride, and illustrations by Liz Danforth, and was published by Iron Crown Enterprises in 1987 as a 112-page book.

Reviews
Dragon #151

References

Middle-earth Role Playing supplements
Role-playing game supplements introduced in 1987